The Shelton is a historic apartment building located at Indianapolis, Indiana.  It was built in 1925, and is a five-story, five bay, buff color brick building. It features a central projecting entrance bay and dressed limestone trim.

It was listed on the National Register of Historic Places in 1983.

References

Apartment buildings in Indiana
Residential buildings on the National Register of Historic Places in Indiana
Residential buildings completed in 1925
Residential buildings in Indianapolis
National Register of Historic Places in Indianapolis